Crucifixion thorn may refer to one of the following North American desert plants:

 Canotia holacantha, a shrub or small tree in the family Celastraceae native to the Mojave and Sonoran Deserts
 Castela emoryi, a shrub or small tree in the family Simaroubaceae native to the Mojave and Sonoran Deserts
 Castela erecta (goatbush), a shrub or small tree in the family Simaroubaceae native to the Chihuahuan Desert 
 Colletia cruciata
 Holacantha stewartii (Stewart crucifixion-thorn), a shrub or small tree in the family Simaroubaceae native to the Chihuahuan Desert
 Koeberlinia spinosa (allthorn), a shrub or small tree in the family Koeberliniaceae native to the Sonoran Desert